Kenneth Staton (born November 25, 1972) is an American professional golfer.

Staton played college golf at Florida State University, where he was chosen after his senior year as an honorable mention All-American by the Golf Coaches Association of America.

Staton began his professional career on the Canadian Tour, where he won six times. He finished second at the 2001 Qualifying school, giving him status on the PGA Tour. He would go on to play 60 events on tour, as well as 61 events on the Web.com Tour.

Staton has been the head coach at Embry–Riddle Aeronautical University since 2010.

Professional wins (6)

Canadian Tour wins (5)
1999 Crown Isle Open, BC TEL Pacific Open, AMEX–SAQ Championship
2001 MTS Classic, Niagara Classic

Other wins (1)
1999 Benefit Partners–NRCS Classic (Canada, non-tour event)

See also
2001 PGA Tour Qualifying School graduates

References

External links

American male golfers
Florida State Seminoles men's golfers
PGA Tour golfers
College golf coaches in the United States
Golfers from Florida
People from Ormond Beach, Florida
Sportspeople from Daytona Beach, Florida
1972 births
Living people